Xu Yang (born June 18, 1987 in Shandong) is a Chinese professional football player who currently plays for Qingdao Hainiu F.C. as a left midfielder or left-back.

Club career
Xu Yang graduated from the Shandong Luneng youth team in 2006 after playing for their various youth teams that trained in Serbia and would soon join a third tier Serbian club in FK Beograd for the second part of the 2006-07 season. However his time in the senior team was to prove extremely frustrating after he was unable to immediately break into the squad. Shandong Luneng were willing to let Xu Yang transfer to Henan Jianye in 2008 where he would make his debut against Changsha Ginde F.C. on 7 September 2008 in a 1-0 loss. Xu Yang would nevertheless quickly established himself within the squad and eventually play in 13 league games throughout the 2008 league season. He would go on to establish himself as vital member of the team and was part of the squad that gained the club's highest ever position of third and qualification to the AFC Champions League for the first time at the end of the 2009 Chinese Super League season. At the end of the 2012 Chinese Super League season, Xu would unfortunately be part of the team that was relegated, however he remained loyal to the club and immediately won the division title and promotion back into the Chinese Super League the following season.  

On 2 January 2016, Xu transferred to fellow Chinese Super League side Chongqing Lifan. On 28 February 2018, Xu transferred to China League One side Shenzhen FC. He would go on to make his debut in a league game on 11 March 2018 against Heilongjiang Lava Spring F.C. that ended in a 2-2 draw. He would go on to establish himself as a regular within the team and go on to gain promotion with the club at the end of the 2018 China League One campaign.

Xu would go back to the second tier and joined Zibo Cuju on 7 April 2021. After only half a season he would join another second tier club in Heilongjiang Ice City on 29 July 2021 On 28 April 2022 he would join second tier football club Shaanxi Chang'an Athletic on a free transfer. After only a handful of games he would leave Shaanxi to transfer to another second tier club in Qingdao Hainiu F.C. on 1 August 2022. He would go on to establish himself as regular within the team that gained promotion to the top tier at the end of the 2022 China League One campaign.

International career
Xu Yang would be called-up to the Chinese national football by the Chinese Head coach Gao Hongbo. He would make his debut against Iran in a friendly, which China won 1-0 on 1 June 2009, where Xu Yang played as a left winger throughout the game.

Career statistics
Statistics accurate as of match played 31 December 2022.

Honours

Club
Henan Jianye
Chinese League One: 2013

Individual
 China League One Most Valuable Player: 2013

References

External links
 
 

1987 births
Living people
Chinese footballers
Association football midfielders
Footballers from Qingdao
China international footballers
Chinese expatriate footballers
FK Beograd players
Expatriate footballers in Serbia
Shandong Taishan F.C. players
Henan Songshan Longmen F.C. players
Chongqing Liangjiang Athletic F.C. players
Shenzhen F.C. players
Chinese Super League players
China League One players